Turmoil Point is the western point of Bristol Island, South Sandwich Islands. This imposing point, rising to 400 m and culminating in a snow-covered summit, is a distinctive landmark when viewed from the west. Named by United Kingdom Antarctic Place-Names Committee (UK-APC). The name refers to the violent air streams commonly encountered during flying operations from HMS seas typical of the locality.

Headlands of South Georgia and the South Sandwich Islands